Karl Emil Julius Ulrich Salchow (7 August 1877 – 19 April 1949) was a Danish-born Swedish figure skater, who dominated the sport in the first decade of the 20th century.

Salchow won the World Figure Skating Championships ten times, from 1901 to 1905, and from 1907 to 1911. This is still a record, which he shares with Sonja Henie who also won 10 titles in the 1920s and 1930s, and with Irina Rodnina who won 10 titles in the 1960s and 1970s.  Salchow did not compete in the 1906 World Championships that were held in Munich, as he feared that he would not be judged fairly against Gilbert Fuchs of Germany. When figure skating was first contested at the Summer Olympic Games in London (1908), Salchow also won the title with ease, became one of the oldest figure skating Olympic champions. In addition, Salchow won the European Championships a record nine times (1898–1900, 1904, 1906–1907, 1909–1910, 1913) and placed second in the World Championships three times.

In 1909, Ulrich Salchow first landed a jump in competition in which he took off on the back inside edge, and landed on the back outside edge of his other foot. This jump is now known as the Salchow jump in his honor.

After his competitive days, Salchow remained active in the sport, and was president of the International Skating Union (ISU) from 1925 to 1937. Furthermore, he was the chairman of AIK in Stockholm between 1928 and 1939 – the leading Swedish club in football, ice-hockey, bandy, tennis and other sports.

Ulrich Salchow was married to the dentist Dr. Anne-Elisabeth Salchow.

Salchow died in Stockholm at the age of 71 and was interred there at Norra begravningsplatsen.

Results

See also
 List of Swedes in sports

References

External links

 International Skating Union – Past Presidents at www.isu.org
 

1877 births
1949 deaths
Sportspeople from Copenhagen
Swedish male single skaters
Figure skaters at the 1908 Summer Olympics
Figure skaters at the 1920 Summer Olympics
Olympic gold medalists for Sweden
Olympic figure skaters of Sweden
Figure skating officials
Olympic medalists in figure skating
World Figure Skating Championships medalists
European Figure Skating Championships medalists
International Skating Union presidents
Burials at Norra begravningsplatsen
Medalists at the 1908 Summer Olympics